

Listed below are executive orders and presidential proclamations signed by United States President Calvin Coolidge. His executive orders and presidential proclamations are also listed on WikiSource.

Executive orders

1923

1924

1925

1926

1927

1928

1929

Presidential proclamations

1923

1924

1925

1929

References

Calvin Coolidge
 
United States federal policy